Events from the year 1666 in Sweden

Incumbents
 Monarch – Charles XI

Events
 The Second Bremen War.
 
 
 The Lund University is founded. 
 Second return to Sweden of Christina, Queen of Sweden.
 Publication of the Upsalia antiqua by Johannes Schefferus.

Births

 4 September - Anna Maria Ehrenstrahl, painter (died 1729) 
 9 November - Carl Gustaf Armfeldt, officer (died 1736) 
 Adolph John II, Count Palatine of Kleeburg, duke (died 1701)

Deaths

 February - Gustav Evertsson Horn, military and politician (born 1614)

References

 
Years of the 17th century in Sweden
Sweden